William Oliveira dos Santos (born 25 February 1992), known as William Oliveira, is a Brazilian footballer who plays for CSA, on loan from Ceará as a centre midfielder.

Career statistics

Honours
Ceará
Copa do Nordeste: 2020

References

External links

1992 births
Living people
Brazilian footballers
Association football midfielders
Campeonato Brasileiro Série A players
Campeonato Brasileiro Série B players
Campeonato Brasileiro Série D players
Centro Educativo Recreativo Associação Atlética São Mateus players
Madureira Esporte Clube players
CR Vasco da Gama players
Bangu Atlético Clube players
Sampaio Corrêa Futebol Clube players
Ceará Sporting Club players
Sport Club do Recife players